Lefteris Choutesiotis (Greek: Λευτέρης Χουτεσιώτης; born 20 July 1994) is a Greek professional footballer who plays as a goalkeeper for Super League club Ionikos.

Career

Olympiacos
Choutesiotis promoted to the first team of Olympiacos and became a pro during January of 2014. He made his debut in Superleague Greece in a 4–0 home victory against Panthrakikos on 3 April 2016.
On 18 May 2018, Choutesiotis signed a two-year extension of his contract.

PAS Giannina
On 9 September 2019, Choutesiotis signed a contract with PAS Giannina the main club in the city of Ioannina. With the club of Ioannina he won the Football League: 2019–20 and got promoted to the Super League Greece.

Career statistics
As of 30 January 2022

Honours
Olympiacos
Super League Greece: 2013–14, 2014–15, 2015–16, 2016–17
Greek Cup: 2014–15

PAS Giannina
Super League Greece 2: 2019–20

References

External links

1994 births
Living people
Greek footballers
Greece under-21 international footballers
Super League Greece players
Super League Greece 2 players
Olympiacos F.C. players
PAS Giannina F.C. players
Ionikos F.C. players
Association football goalkeepers
People from Larissa (regional unit)
Footballers from Thessaly